The third season of Adventure Time, an American animated television series created by Pendleton Ward, premiered on Cartoon Network on July 11, 2011 and concluded on February 13, 2012, and was produced by Frederator Studios and Cartoon Network Studios. The season follows the adventures of Finn, a human boy, and his best friend and adoptive brother Jake, a dog with magical powers to change shape and size at will. Finn and Jake live in the post-apocalyptic Land of Ooo, where they interact with the other main characters of the show: Princess Bubblegum, The Ice King, Marceline the Vampire Queen, Lumpy Space Princess, and BMO.

This season saw the series grow and progress, featuring the first of the popular Fionna and Cake episodes, as well as marking the first time that fan-submitted content was canonized. Ward also noted that the storyboard artists affected the overall tone of the show, moving it towards more bizarre and spiritual matters. The season was storyboarded and written by Ako Castuera, Tom Herpich, Adam Muto, Rebecca Sugar, Jesse Moynihan, Bert Youn, Kent Osborne, Somvilay Xayaphone, Pendleton Ward, and Natasha Allegri.

The first episode of the season, "Conquest of Cuteness" was watched by 2.686 million viewers; this marked an increase in viewers watching Cartoon Network when compared to the previous season's debut. The season ended with the cliffhanger "Incendium", which was resolved at the start of season four. The season was met with largely positive critical reception. In addition, several episodes and writers were nominated for awards; the episode "Thank You" was nominated for an Annie Award as well as an award at the Sundance Film Festival. "Too Young" was nominated for an Emmy Award. Storyboard artist Rebecca Sugar was also nominated for an Annie Award. Several compilation DVDs that contained episodes from the season were released after the season finished airing. The full season set was released on February 25, 2014 on DVD and Blu-ray.

Development

Concept
The season follows the adventures of Finn the Human, a human boy, and his best friend Jake, a dog with magical powers to change shape and grow and shrink at will. Finn and Jake live in the post-apocalyptic Land of Ooo, wherein they interact with the other major characters, including: Princess Bubblegum, The Ice King, Marceline the Vampire Queen, Lumpy Space Princess, and BMO. Common storylines revolve around: Finn and Jake discovering strange creatures, battling the Ice King, and battling monsters in order to help others. This season expands upon the backstories of Marceline and Ice King, and concludes with Finn attempting to understand his attraction towards Bubblegum and developing a crush on newly introduced Flame Princess.

Production
After the increasing success of the series, on November 29, 2010 Deadline Hollywood announced that Cartoon Network had renewed the series for a third season. The episode titles were released on April 6, 2011 by Frederator Studios, while the show was nearing the end of its second season. Based on production numbers, "Conquest of Cuteness" was the first episode that underwent production, which was also the first episode aired. In April 2011, the storyboards for season three were nearing completion, and much of the production staff shifted its focus to the show's fourth season.

The ninth episode, entitled "Fionna and Cake" takes place in a gender bent version of Ooo. The premise of this episode is that the Ice King has created a fan fiction wherein all the main characters of Adventure Time appear in the opposite gender. For instance, Finn the Human has become Fionna the Human, and Jake the Dog is now Cake the Cat. The genesis for the episode were drawings that storyboard artist Natasha Allegri posted onto the internet during her free time. Her creations were eventually canonized by the show's producers. Allegri even re-rerecorded the show's theme—which had originally been sung by series creator Pendleton Ward—for the episode. The episode had a sequel during the fifth season, focusing on Marceline's male counterpart, Marshall Lee, who is voiced by Donald Glover.

Before the third season, Ward cautioned fans that, due to legal reasons, he was unable to accept fan creations for characters and stories. However, the sixteenth episode, "Jake vs. Me-Mow" features the titular character Me-Mow, which was drawn by Gunnar Gilmore, aged 14. Gilmore had sketched the character and showed his mother, who forwarded it to Cartoon Network. Ward decided to include the character solely because the character was "so cute". Gilmore's original drawing was used for the episode's title card. So far, this appears to be the only fan-created character that Ward has allowed on the show.

This season's episodes were produced in a process similar to those of the previous seasons. Each episode was outlined in two-to-three pages that contained the necessary plot information. These outlines were then handed to storyboard artists, who created full storyboards. Design and coloring were done at Cartoon Network Studios in Burbank, California, and animation was handled overseas in South Korea by Rough Draft Korea and Saerom Animation. The season was storyboarded and written by Ako Castuera, Tom Herpich, Adam Muto, Rebecca Sugar, Jesse Moynihan, Bert Youn, Osborne, Somvilay Xayaphone, Ward, and Allegri. Pendleton Ward referred to many of the writers during the third season as "really smart, smartypants people" who were responsible for inserting weirder and more spiritual ideas into the series. He attributed much of this to the background of the writers, many of whom were formerly involved in indie comics.

Cast

The voice actors for the season include: Jeremy Shada (Finn the Human), John DiMaggio (Jake the Dog), Tom Kenny (The Ice King), Hynden Walch (Princess Bubblegum), and Olivia Olson (Marceline the Vampire Queen). Ward himself provides the voice for several minor characters, as well as Lumpy Space Princess. Former storyboard artist Niki Yang voices the sentient video game console BMO, as well as Jake's girlfriend Lady Rainicorn in Korean. Polly Lou Livingston, a friend of Pendleton Ward's mother, Bettie Ward, plays the voice of the small elephant Tree Trunks. Season three would also introduce Flame Princess, voiced by Jessica DiCicco; Flame Princess would go on to have a larger role in the fourth and fifth seasons of the show, as well as become Finn's new romantic interest. The Adventure Time cast records their lines together as opposed to doing it individually. This is to capture more natural sounding dialogue among the characters. Hynden Walch has described these group session as akin to "doing a play reading—a really, really out there play."

The series also regularly employs guest voices for various characters. For instance, Jackie Buscarino appears as the Cute King in "Conquest of Cuteness". Steve Agee voices Ash, Marceline's ex-boyfriend, and Ava Acres as young Marceline in "Memory of a Memory". Isabella Acres reprises her role as a young Princess Bubblegum, and Justin Roiland makes his debut as Lemongrab in the episode "Too Young". Lemongrab would soon becoming a recurring character. Steve Little voices the character Abracadaniel, and Maurice LaMarche appears as the Grand Master Wizard in the episode "Wizard Battle". For the gender bent episode "Fionna and Cake", Madeleine Martin voiced Fionna, Roz Ryan played the part of Cake the Cat, Grey DeLisle appeared as the Ice Queen, and Neil Patrick Harris voiced Prince Gumball. Rich Fulcher appears as Jaybird and Ron Lynch voices the character Pig in "Apple Thief". Jackie Buscarino reprises her role as Susan Strong in the episode "Beautopia". Kyla Rae Kowalewski voices the character Me-Mow in the episode "Jake vs. Me-Mow". Musical parodist "Weird Al" Yankovic appears as the Banana Man in the episode "The New Frontier"; the character was originally supposed to be voiced by Jonathan Katz before Yankovic was chosen after Katz was unable to. Peter Browngardt voices the eponymous character in "Paper Pete". Gregg Turkington appears as the Talking Shrub in "Another Way". Sam Marin voices Clarence in "Ghost Princess". In the episode "Incendium", Keith David makes his debut as Flame King.

Various other characters are voiced by Tom Kenny, Dee Bradley Baker, Maria Bamford, Little, and Kent Osborne.

Broadcast and reception

Ratings
The season debuted on July 11, 2011, with the episode "Conquest of Cuteness". The episode was watched by 2.686 million viewers. This marked an increase from the second-season premiere, which had been viewed by 2.001 million viewers, and it marked a drastic increase from the second-season finale, which was watched by only 1.975 million viewers. "Conquest of Cuteness" also marked gains when compared to the same timeslot a year prior; growth in kids and boys aged 6–11, 2-11 and 9-14 ranged between 13 and 40 percent. The season hit a high with its ninth episode, "Fionna and Cake", which was watched by 3.315 million viewers. This made the episode, at the time, the highest-rated entry in the series in its three-season run. The season finale, "Incendium", aired on February 13, 2012 ranked as the number one telecast of the week among boys aged 6–11 on all of television. This season remained at the same timeslot as the first two seasons, Mondays at 8:00 pm.

Reviews and accolades
Mike LeChevallier  of Slant magazine award the third season three and a half stars out of four. In his review, LeChevallier wrote that the series "scores relatively high marks for storytelling, artwork, music, voice acting, and realization with its neatly wrapped, 11-minute packages of multicolored awesomeness." He further complimented the show because he felt that "it scarcely appears to be trying too hard to attract attention, yet it does just that". He did note that "the short-form format leaves some emotional substance to be desired", although he noted this was inevitable for a series with such short episodes.

"Fionna and Cake" was particularly successful with the fans of the series; according to Entertainment Examiner, after the episode aired, "fans of the series loved the new interpretation and clamored for more Fionna and Cake". Ward has revealed that he is particularly pleased with the episode "Thank You"; he elaborated, "I think it's awesome that with a show called Adventure Time with Finn and Jake, we can just forget about Finn and Jake for a little bit and the network will just let us follow this creature around".

The series was nominated for two separate Annie Awards: one for Best Animated Special Production for "Thank You", and another for Best Storyboarding in a Television Production for Rebecca Sugar. The series, however, failed to win either. The episode "Too Young" was nominated for a 2012 Primetime Emmy Award for Outstanding Short-format Animated Program, although the episode did not win. The episode "Thank You" was also purposely screened in a movie theatre so that it could qualify for the Academy Award for Best Animated Short Film. Although it made the award's short list, it did not make the final list of ten nominees. "Thank You" was later in the running for the Animated Short Film award at the Sundance Film Festival in early 2013, although it did not win the award.

Episodes

Home media
Warner Home Video released multiple DVD volumes, such as It Came from the Nightosphere, Jake vs. Me-Mow, Fionna and Cake, The Suitor, Princess Day, Finn the Human, Frost & Fire, and The Enchiridion which contain episodes from the third season. All DVD releases can be purchased on the Cartoon Network Shop, and the individual episodes can be downloaded from both the iTunes Store and Amazon.com.

Full season release
The full season set was released on DVD and Blu-ray on February 25, 2014. By March 9, 2014, the DVD release had sold 32,056 copies, and the Blu-ray set had sold 8,577 copies.

Notes

References

2011 American television seasons
2012 American television seasons
Adventure Time seasons